Leasowe is a village in the Metropolitan Borough of Wirral in Merseyside, England. Historically within Cheshire (ceased to be in 1974), Leasowe was part of the old County Borough of Wallasey. It is now within the Leasowe and Moreton East Ward of the Metropolitan Borough of Wirral, as well as the Wallasey parliamentary constituency.

At the 2001 census, Leasowe had a population of 6,180. 
By the time of the 2011 census specific figures for Leasowe were no longer maintained. The total population of the Leasowe and Moreton East Ward was 14,640.

History
The name 'Leasowe' comes from the Anglo-Saxon Leasowes or 'Meadow Pastures'. Its sand dunes are the largest such system on the Wirral. Much of the area is at or below sea level and is protected by the coastal embankment. Houses built in the early 20th century were often flooded and unsanitary, but after about 1926, new roads and drainage were put in by the Borough Council, and much new housing was developed. Along the embankment between Leasowe and Moreton are the remains of fortifications built during the Second World War.

The world's first passenger hovercraft service operated in 1961–62. The service travelled from Moreton Common, and was advertised as between Wallasey and Rhyl in North Wales. However, the service was not profitable and soon ceased.

Geography
The River Fender merges with the Birket at Leasowe. The Birket then continues towards West Float at the site of the former Wallasey Pool.

Landmarks

Solar School
On Leasowe Road is the first building in the world to be heated entirely by solar energy. At 53.4°N, it is also the most northerly. The "Solar Campus" was formerly St George's Secondary School and was built in 1961 to the designs of Emslie Morgan, the Assistant Borough Architect, who spent a lifetime looking into ways of harnessing the sun's rays. His research resulted in a matchbox like building with, on one side a drab, windowless façade and on the other  of glass, a giant solar wall. The wall is built of glass leaves two feet apart. These draw the ultra violet rays from sunshine and bounce them around the walls of the classrooms. The walls become warm and heat the air. Hardly any warmth escapes through the school's massively thick roof and walls covered with slabs of plastic foam. On the coldest days it is always  inside, and in summer the school is cooler than its more conventional neighbours, for panels inside the glass wall can be turned to deflect heat or absorb it.

In practice, the large convector ducts which direct the warmed air to the colder north side of the building are a major safety hazard, and fire breaks have had to be inserted to reduce or cut off the air flow. The result is that on sunny days the south, glazed side of the building reaches unbearable temperatures in excess of 40 °C while for most of the time the unglazed north side never reaches a comfortable temperature nor receives much natural light.

A secondary, small single-pipe heating system was installed to give additional heating on cold winter days with very few hours of sunlight. The system is fuelled by oil, which was cheap at the time. Today, the secondary heating has to be used very often, and is very expensive.

The property is maintained by the Children & Young People's Department of the Metropolitan Borough of Wirral, which struggles to find the necessary revenue and capital to fully maintain this Grade II* listed building.

Leasowe Castle

Leasowe Castle may have been built for Ferdinando Stanley, 5th Earl of Derby – a patron of Shakespeare – in 1593, possibly (though this is disputed) as an observation platform for the Wallasey races which took place on the sands in the 16th and 17th centuries, and which are regarded as a forerunner of the Derby races. Ferdinando's brother William, the 6th Earl, was described as a noted sportsman and is remembered as a keen supporter of the Wallasey races.

At first the castle consisted only of an octagonal tower. This had become disused by 1700, and it became known as "Mockbeggar Hall", a term often used for an ornate but derelict building. The term "Mockbeggar Wharf" is still used for the adjoining foreshore. The "Mockbeggar Hall" is also the name of a Wetherspoons pub in neighbouring Moreton.

In 1821 ownership passed to the Cust family. After 1826 the building was used as a hotel for some years. The ceiling of the Star Chamber at the Palace of Westminster was brought to the castle in 1836 along with panelling and other furnishings; they had been salvaged from the old Palace of Westminster before the Star Chamber was demolished in an 1806 building project. The Star Chamber was so called because the ceiling was decorated with bright stars. The ceiling and four tapestries depicting the four seasons still remain. Oak panelling from the Star Chamber and some made from the submerged forest along the coast were also installed.
However the oak panels were removed in 1893.

Between 1911 and 1970, it became a railway convalescent home, and between 1974 and 1980 it was owned by Wirral Borough Council. It reopened as a hotel in December 1982, and was acquired by Lawton Hotels Ltd in 2000. The hotel is now a popular venue for weddings and other family functions, with around 50 bedrooms.

Leasowe Lighthouse

Leasowe Lighthouse was built in 1763 by Liverpool Corporation's Docks Committee (the forerunner of the Mersey Docks and Harbour Board) and is the oldest brick-built lighthouse in Britain. According to local tradition its foundations were built on bales of cotton from a nearby shipwreck. Around 1763, William Hutchinson installed what may have been the first parabolic reflector in a lighthouse. The lighthouse was one of four lights on the North Wirral foreshore, the others being two at Hoylake and another – a lower light – at Leasowe. The latter was soon destroyed by the sea and was replaced by a lighthouse on Bidston Hill in 1771.

The lighthouse was operational until 14 July 1908, 
with the only known female lighthouse keeper in those days, a Mrs. Williams. It then became a tearoom for a period, but was unused before 1989, since when it has been the base for the ranger service of the North Wirral Coastal Park. The building houses a visitor centre and is occasionally open to the public.

Leasowe Hospital

Leasowe Hospital or; The Leasowe Sanatorium For Crippled Children and Hospital for Tuberculosis, to give its full and original name, later became known as the Liverpool Open-Air Hospital, Leasowe, and finally Leasowe Hospital.

To tell the story of the hospital, one name above all stands out and that is Margaret Beavan (1877-1931). She was the driving force, admired by all, she was known affectionately as the 'Little Mother of Liverpool', also not quite as complimentary – the 'Mighty Atom' and 'Clever Beggar'.

The first mention of a Sanatorium for children with Tuberculosis occurred on 16 December 1911. Slowly Leasowe Hospital changed from being principally a children's T.B. hospital to one for dealing with burns and skin grafts, and then arthritis until its closure in 1979. Another name closely associated with 'Leasowe'; amongst others, is that of (the late) Dr T.R. Littler, Consultant Rheumatologist, who was devoted to Leasowe. Leasowe Hospital was eventually bought by the Wirral Christian Centre in 1981 and was used later as a retirement home and handicap centre. After failing to make that facility work the buildings were eventually repossessed then later demolished around 2002–03. Luxury flats and houses have since been built on the site.

Transport
Leasowe railway station is situated on the Wirral Line of the Merseyrail network.

Governance
Leasowe is part of the Wallasey parliamentary constituency and represented by Angela Eagle MP.

The majority of the Leasowe area is governed locally as part of the Leasowe & Moreton East ward, which takes in the Leasowe housing estate, developments along Leasowe Road and East Moreton. Between 2008 and 2014, one of the councillors was Ian Lewis – the first-ever Conservative councillor to represent the area on Wirral Council. The most recent local elections took place on 6 May 2021, with the ward being represented by three Labour Party councillors.

Notable people
 Malcolm Lowry, English writer, born in Leasowe.
 Shirley Ballas (Head Judge on Strictly Come Dancing) 2017-

See also

North Wirral Coastal Park

References

Sources

Bibliography

External links

Wallasey's pioneering Solar School 46 years on – "Building" 2007, issue 23
Metropolitan Borough of Wirral: North Wirral Coastal Park
Metropolitan Borough of Wirral: Leasowe Lighthouse
Location Map: Leasowe Lighthouse
Friends of Leasowe Lighthouse
Look through the Webcam on top of Leasowe Lighthouse
1828 tour of Leasowe Castle
St Georges School Reunion and History
Wirral History

Towns and villages in the Metropolitan Borough of Wirral
Beaches of Merseyside
Grade II listed lighthouses